The Muslim Council of Britain (MCB) is a national umbrella body with over 500 mosques and educational and charitable associations affiliated to it. It includes national, regional, local, and specialist Muslim organisations and institutions from different ethnic and sectarian backgrounds within major parts of, but not all, British Islamic society.

Its vision statement is "empowering the Muslim community towards achieving a just, cohesive and successful British society". The MCB is founded upon three core concepts. The first is that it is independent: "core funding comes from membership fees". Secondly, it is cross-sectarian, meaning "members belong to Islam's diverse religious traditions." Finally, the MCB is democratic, in that its "leadership is elected for 2-year terms and is accountable to members". The current Secretary General is Zara Mohammed.

It has been called the "best known and most powerful" of the many organisations that have been founded in the 1990s and 2000s to represent Britain's Muslims. Since 2009, the Labour Party, the Conservative-Liberal Democrat coalition and the Conservative governments have maintained a policy of "non-engagement" with the Muslim Council of Britain due to allegations the group doesn't represent the British Muslim community and claims that members of the council have made 'favourable' remarks about extremists in the past.

History
At its first General Assembly, held on 1 March 1998, the MCB elected a Central Working Committee and office-bearers for the first time.

The Secretary General from 1997 to 2006, Iqbal Sacranie, received a knighthood in the 2005 Queen's Birthday Honours for his longstanding service to the community and interfaith dialogue. The organisation has had a chequered history in its relationship with and recognition by the UK government since at least 2006. During the 2010–2015 Coalition government, the MCB met with a number of Liberal Democrat ministers, including the Minister for Communities, Stephen Williams, at the Department for Communities and Local Government in September 2014, the Energy Secretary Ed Davey in 2014, and the Deputy Prime Minister Nick Clegg at the Cabinet Office in September 2015.

Funding
The MCB's core administrative expenses are funded entirely by affiliation fees from members, as well as donations from individuals and grant-giving organisations. The MCB also runs projects to raise the capability of British Muslim communities and to widen good practice. All MCB projects self-fundraise through sponsorship, donations or grants, and MCB does not have a central 'pot' of money to fund internal or externally-led projects.

In 2005, the MCB received a project-specific £150,000 Government grant for a number of specific projects. These were: the MCB leadership development programme; the MCB leadership mentoring programme; MCB direct, a web portal for information on Islam and Muslims; a British citizenship programme; and the British Muslim Equality Programme. The MCB had requested £500,000 and was criticised for accepting even the lower actual figure because it might be perceived as threatening its independent status.

Campaigns and projects
 Towards Greater Understanding is a 2007 document produced by the MCB "intended to be used, as a source of reference by schools when reviewing their policies and practices in relation to meeting the needs of their South-Asian Muslim pupils". The report claims to be an attempt at education because "South-Asian Muslims are experiencing racism and Islamophobia both personally and institutionally through forms of marginalisation, discrimination, prejudice and stereotyping".
 Visit My Mosque day: Facilitated by the MCB first in 2005, this initiative encourages mosques across the UK to hold open days at the same time. In 2016 over 80 mosques took part, including mosques in England, Scotland, Wales and Northern Ireland; the figure exceeded 200 in February 2018.

Muslim women 
In 2018, the MCB launched the Women in Mosques Development Programme, which aimed to train women to run mosques and other organizations and institutions through personal 1-1 mentoring and specialised workshops over a period of six months. Regarding the limited number of Muslim women on trustee or management boards of mosques, the MCB stated that "the lack of diversity is unacceptable". In 2011, the MCB expressed that a woman not covering their face with a veil is shortcoming, and Muslims that advocate such behavior are in jeopardy of "rejecting Islam".

Views
The MCB condemned the 2003 invasion of Iraq as "a massive disconnect between public opinion – including Muslim opinion – on the one side and the political classes on the other". The group condemns terrorism by Muslims and non-Muslims alike and has urged Muslims to help in the fight against terrorism. Nevertheless, though the MCB has unequivocally condemned terrorism committed by Muslims against Jews and Jewish targets both in Britain and in other countries, it has never condemned Islamic terrorism against Jews in Israel or in the Palestinian territories. Following allegations that police had wire-tapped a Muslim member of parliament, the Council said it was vital "to hold to account the improper behaviour of senior police officers."

In 2004, the MCB criticised Cardinal Cormac Murphy-O'Connor, head of the Catholic Church of England and Wales, when he said that Muslim leaders were not doing enough to denounce terrorists who carried out attacks "in the name of Allah", while clarifying that they denounced terrorism.

Following the 7 July 2005 London bombings, the MCB issued statements expressing its disgust at the events: "All of us must unite in helping the police to capture these murderers."

In February 2006, the MCB urged MPs to vote for the Lords' amendment to the Terrorism Act 2006, which removed the "glorification of terrorism" clause from the bill. They stated that the bill was perceived as "unfairly targeting Muslims and stifling legitimate debate". The bill was eventually passed without the amendment by 315 votes to 277. The opposition of the council to the clause and to British policy in Iraq attracted both praise and criticism. Sunny Hundal wrote in an exchange with Iqbal Sacranie: "In order to defeat violent extremism, we must understand what motivates these people and what turns them into killers. What puts them in that frame of mind? The Iraq War alone is not enough." He also criticised what he saw as close links between the MCB and the Labour Party. Sacranie conceded that "propaganda literature may well play a role", but emphasised: "such propaganda can only be effective because of the conducive atmosphere we have helped create."

The MCB has co-operated with trade unions and issued a joint statement with the Trades Union Congress urging better community relations and encouraging Muslims to join trade unions.

On 3 March 2008, the MCB criticised the Foreign Secretary David Miliband's response to Israel's killing of over 100 Palestinians in Gaza as "blatantly one-sided." It said, "If we are serious about wanting peace, we must act as honest brokers, not partisan bystanders."

When schoolteacher Gillian Gibbons was jailed in Sudan for allowing her class to name a teddy bear Muhammad, the same as the Muslim prophet, the MCB condemned the incident as "a gross overreaction" and said the Sudanese authorities lacked basic common sense.

Following the fatal bombing of Manchester Arena in May 2017, MCB Secretary General Harun Khan condemned the attack, saying "This is horrific, this is criminal. May the perpetrators face the full weight of justice both in this life and the next."

Controversies

Holocaust
Between 2001 and 2007, the Muslim Council of Britain (MCB) expressed its unwillingness to attend the Holocaust Memorial Day ceremony and associated events.  In a press release dated 26 January 2001 the Council listed two points of contention that prevented them from attending the event, which were that it "totally excludes and ignores the ongoing genocide and violation of Human Rights in the occupied Palestinian territories, in Jammu and Kashmir and elsewhere" and that "It includes the controversial question of alleged Armenian genocide as well as the so-called gay genocide."

Since 2007, the MCB has called for the day to be replaced by a "Genocide Memorial Day". On 3 December 2007, the MCB voted to end the boycott.  Assistant general secretary Inayat Bunglawala argued it was "inadvertently causing hurt to some in the Jewish community".  It drew criticism; for example Anas al-Tikriti said: "rather than a mere remembrance of victims of one of the most heinous crimes in history", Holocaust Memorial Day has "become a political event" which "glorifies the state of Israel, turning a collective blind eye to the immeasurable suffering of Palestinians at the hands of Israelis every single day."

Sectarianism
Historically, MCB has constantly spoken out against sectarianism. In 2013, the council signed an intra-faith unity declaration between a number of Islamic schools and branches within both Sunni and Shia denominations of Islam. In April 2016, following the "religiously prejudiced" murder of a British Ahmadi Muslim, Asad Shah, the MCB denounced any form of murder, but also said nobody should be "forced" to accept the Ahmadiyya Community as part of the wider Muslim community.

The MCB has been criticised by Martin Bright, among others, for failing to be truly representative. He said, in response to an article by Madeleine Bunting: "any body that represents itself as speaking for the Muslim community must demonstrate that is entirely non-sectarian and non-factional. The MCB has consistently failed in this area and the Government should consider cutting all ties until it has thoroughly reformed itself." Bunting disagreed, saying: "To the extent that the government over-relied on the MCB, it was due to the laziness of the government wanting only to hear one voice". She said it would be "absurd to exclude the MCB, the biggest Muslim organisation in this country and the one that has achieved the greatest degree of non-factionalism and non-sectarianism."

Homosexuality
The MCB opposed the repeal of Section 28 on the grounds that presenting "homosexual practice as equivalent to marriage or in a morally neutral way is deeply offensive to Muslims" and that a repeal "undermines the institution of the family and will damage the fabric of our society". Yet, in April 2007, the Muslim Council of Britain issued a statement supporting the government legislation "prohibiting discrimination in the provision of goods and services on grounds of sexual orientation".

On 3 January 2006, Iqbal Sacranie told BBC Radio 4's PM programme he believes homosexuality is "not acceptable" and denounced same-sex civil partnerships as "harmful". Gay rights campaigners, such as Peter Tatchell, called for a "dialogue" between the MCB and gay organisations. In April 2007, the MCB formally declared its support for the Equality Act, which outlaws discrimination on the grounds of sexual orientation. The journalist Brian Whitaker said: "the Muslim Council of Britain has begun to move towards accepting homosexuality".

Schools and education
MCB guidance for schools says that parents of Muslim children should be allowed to withdraw their children from school activities involving mixed swimming, dance, sex and relationship education, music, drama, and figurative drawing on religious grounds. On farm visits, touching or feeding pigs should be prohibited. It also warns that pupils and parents may refuse to shake hands with the opposite sex during prize-giving ceremonies. The Daily Express newspaper referred to the publication as demanding "Taleban-style" conditions. It said music lessons were unacceptable to around 10% of Muslim pupils.

Based on information from the MCB, Stoke-on-Trent City Council issued a Ramadan guide to all schools. The document said schools should reschedule swimming lessons, sex education and exams so they are outside the month of Ramadan.

Jyllands-Posten Muhammad cartoons controversy
When editorial cartoons of Muhammad were printed in the Danish daily newspaper Jyllands-Posten on 30 September 2005, the MCB saw them as reflecting "the emergence of an increasingly xenophobic tone being adopted towards Muslims in parts of the Western media" and argued, "We should not allow our valued freedoms in Europe to be abused by those deliberately seeking to provoke hatred and division between communities". At the same time, it said they regarded "the violent threats made against Danish and EU citizens by some groups in the Muslim world as completely unacceptable."

Istanbul Declaration controversy
In March 2009, The Observer reported that people including Daud Abdullah, the Deputy Secretary General of the MCB, had signed what has become known as the Istanbul Declaration (not to be confused with the 2004 Istanbul summit) in January of that year. This was in reaction to Israeli military action in Gaza of December 2008 and January 2009. As reported, the Declaration implored the "Islamic Nation" to oppose by any means all individuals deemed supportive of the "Zionist enemy" (meaning Israel). At the time of signing, political leaders, including the British Prime Minister, Gordon Brown had suggested providing peacekeeping naval forces to monitor arms-smuggling between Gaza and Egypt.

Hazel Blears, Secretary of State for Communities and Local Government in the UK, published an open letter saying the government would have no further dealings with the MCB until it distanced itself from the declaration and Abdullah resigned. Abdullah responded in The Guardian by describing her remarks as a "misguided and ill-advised attempt to exercise control." He later said he intended to sue Blears for libel if she did not retract her letter and apologise.

The government rejected his threat.

Islamophobia in the Conservative Party

The Muslim Council of Britain has repeatedly demanded an investigation in Islamophobia in the Conservative Party. In June 2018, the organisation said there are now "more than weekly incidents" involving Conservative candidates and representatives. In an open letter, the organisation told chairman Brandon Lewis he must "ensure racists and bigots have no place" in the party. The Conservative Muslim Forum accused the Conservative Party of a failure to take action on Islamophobia and joined calls for an independent inquiry. In addition, 350 mosques and 11 umbrella organisations across the UK have urged the Conservatives to launch internal inquiry into Islamophobia claims. In July, the organisation repeated its call for an independent inquiry into Islamophobia and accused the Conservatives of turning blind eye to Islamophobia claims.

Unfair media coverage
In July 2019, The Muslim Council of Britain began to launch a "campaign in Parliament for fairer media coverage". After viewing over 10,000 articles and TV clips, the MCB suggested that 43% of media clips portray Muslims with a negative association. In regards to Muslims, the British media "tended to focus on a narrow range of issues and recurrent, negative types of characterization". The MCB also condemned the BBC drama series Bodyguard, stating that it "pandered to stereotypes of Muslim women who wear the hijab as oppressed or subservient".

See also

Islam in the United Kingdom
Festival of Muslim Cultures
Muhammad Abdul Bari

References

External links
 Comment is Free articles by Inayat Bunglawala, Assistant Secretary-General at the MCB

Islamic organizations established in 1997
Islamic organisations based in the United Kingdom
Islamist groups
1997 establishments in the United Kingdom